The 39th Golden Horse Awards (Mandarin:第39屆金馬獎) took place on November 16, 2002 at Kaohsiung Cultural Center in Kaohsiung, Taiwan.

References

39th
2002 film awards
2002 in Taiwan